László György Lukács (Karcag, 1983.03.07) – Hungarian lawyer, politician, since 2014 member of Hungarian National Assembly, vice-president of Jobbik.

Early life 
Between 1995 and 2002 he was student in Gábor Áron High School in Karcag and between 2000 and 2001 he learnt in Lebanon High School in Virginia. He graduated from the Faculty of Law of the Eötvös Loránd University. He speaks German and English as well.

Political career 
In 2010 he was the mayoral candidate for Karcag in the 2010 municipal elections. He got 21% of the votes, finishing second. 
He was Jobbik's MP candidate in Constituency III. of Jász-Nagykun-Szolnok County at the 2018 Hungarian national elections. He got 32,92% of votes, finishing second. 
Between 2010 and 2014 he was a Member of City Assembly in Karcag. Since 2014 member of Hungarian National Assembly. He deals with health service in the National Assembly.
On 25 January 2020, he was elected for vice-president in Jobbik.

He lives in Karcag with his wife and two children.

References 

1983 births
Living people
21st-century Hungarian lawyers
Members of the National Assembly of Hungary (2014–2018)
Members of the National Assembly of Hungary (2022–2026)
People from Karcag
Eötvös Loránd University alumni
Jobbik politicians